The Last Place on Earth is a 1985 Central Television seven-part serial, written by Trevor Griffiths based on the book Scott and Amundsen by Roland Huntford. The book is an exploration of the expeditions of Captain Robert F. Scott (played by Martin Shaw) and his Norwegian rival in polar exploration, Roald Amundsen (played by Sverre Anker Ousdal) in their attempts to reach the South Pole.

The series ran for seven episodes and starred a wide range of UK and Norwegian character actors as well as featuring some famous names, such as Max von Sydow, Alexander Knox, Richard Wilson, Sylvester McCoy, Brian Dennehy, and Pat Roach. It also featured performances early in their careers by Bill Nighy and Hugh Grant.

Subsequently, Huntford's book was republished under the same name. The book put forth the point of view that Amundsen's success in reaching the South Pole was abetted by much superior planning, whereas errors by Scott (notably including the reliance on man-hauling instead of sled dogs) ultimately resulted in the death of him and his companions.

Episodes
Episode 1: "Poles Apart"

Episode 2: "Minor Diversion"

Episode 3: "Leading Men"

Episode 4: "Gentlemen and Players"

Episode 5: "Glories of the Race"

Episode 6: "Foregone Conclusion"

Episode 7: "Rejoice"

Production

A great number of the scenes showing both the Norwegian and British parties on the Antarctic Continent could not be replicated except in very few places.  For the series, all production was located at Frobisher Bay on Baffin Island which in and of itself, due to the remoteness and frigid temperatures, subjected both cast and crew to conditions not too different from the actual expeditions in 1912.

Cast

Martin Shaw – Captain R. F. Scott
Sverre Anker Ousdal – Roald Amundsen
Max von Sydow – Fridtjof Nansen
Brian Dennehy – Frederick Cook
Alexander Knox – Sir Clements Markham
Stephen Moore – Dr. "Uncle Bill" Wilson
Ståle Bjørnhaug – Olav Bjaaland
Michael Maloney – Lieutenant "Teddy" Evans
Richard Morant – Captain "Titus" Oates
Sylvester McCoy – Lieutenant "Birdie" Bowers
Robin Soans – Dr. "Atch" Atkinson
Jan Hårstad – Helmer Hanssen
Erik Hivju – Sverre Hassel
Jon Eikemo – Adolf Lindstrøm
Ivar Nørve – Oscar Wisting
Hans Ola Sørlie - Jørgen Stubberud
Nils Ole Oftebro - Thorvald Nilsen
Bjørn Skagestad - Kristian Prestrud
Sven Nordin - Tryggve Gran
Pat Roach – Edgar Evans
Susan Wooldridge – Kathleen Scott, née Bruce
Bill Nighy – Cecil Meares
Hans Ola Sørlie – Jørgen Stubberud
Tom Georgeson – Chief Stoker "Bill" Lashly
Hugh Grant – Apsley Cherry-Garrard
Daragh O'Malley – Tom Crean

References

External links

ITV television dramas
Television series by ITV Studios
1985 British television series debuts
1985 British television series endings
1980s British drama television series
1980s British television miniseries
Television shows based on books
English-language television shows
Television shows produced by Central Independent Television
Cultural depictions of Roald Amundsen
Cultural depictions of Robert Falcon Scott